The 2002 Princeton Tigers football team was an American football team that represented Princeton University during the 2002 NCAA Division I-AA football season. The Tigers tied for third in the Ivy League.

In their third year under head coach Roger Hughes, the Tigers compiled a 6–4 record, though they were outscored 236 to 226. Drew Babinecz and Chisom Opara were the team captains.

Princeton's 4–3 conference record tied for third in the Ivy League standings. The Tigers were outscored 176 to 154 by Ivy opponents. 

The Tigers played their home games at Princeton Stadium on the university campus in Princeton, New Jersey.

Schedule

References

Princeton
Princeton Tigers football seasons
Princeton Tigers football